The Perm Operation (November 1918 – January 1919) was a military operation during the Russian Civil War.

Background 
At the end of 1918, the situation on the Eastern Front of the Russian Civil War was unclear. The forces of the Eastern White Movement tried to advance in two directions simultaneously: on the one hand towards the North-West to connect with the Northern Russia Front, on the other hand towards the South-West to connect with the Southern Russia Front and the troops of Anton Denikin and Pyotr Wrangel. The Red Army considered the Southwestern advance of the White Army as the main threat, and concentrated its main forces in the Southern Ural region.

Offensive of Siberian Army 
On 29 November the 1st Middle Siberian Corps of the Siberian Army, led by Anatoly Pepelyayev, began its advance towards the North-West. On 21 December the Siberian Army captured Kungur, and on 24 December Perm. The Red Army lost 18,000 men, but the losses of the White Army were also great. Therefore, on 6 January 1919, White Russian Supreme Commander Alexander Kolchak ordered the 1st Middle Siberian Corps of the Siberian Army to hold its advance and defend.

Counteroffensive of Red Army 
On 19 January the Red Army began its counteroffensive to recapture Perm and Kungur. Up to 28 January the Red 2nd Army advanced 20–40 km, the Red 3rd Army only 10–20 km. The main objectives weren't achieved.

Battles of the Russian Civil War
November 1918 events
December 1918 events
January 1919 events